Linda Barnes (born December 6, 1949) is an American mystery writer.

Biography
Linda Barnes was born and raised in Detroit, and graduated cum laude from the School of Fine and Applied Arts at Boston University. After college, Barnes became a drama teacher and director at Chelmsford and Lexington, Massachusetts schools. While teaching drama, Barnes wrote two plays, the award-winning "Wings" and "Prometheus",  and went on to write highly successful mystery novels.

Linda Barnes lives near Boston with her husband and has one son.

Novels
Barnes is best known for her series featuring Carlotta Carlyle, a 6'1" redheaded detective from Boston. Carlotta Carlyle is in the tradition of the hard-boiled female detectives created by Sue Grafton and Sara Paretsky.

Michael Spraggue series
 Blood Will Have Blood (1981)	
 Bitter Finish (1982)	
 Dead Heat (1984)	
 Cities Of The Dead (1985)

Carlotta Carlyle series
 A Trouble Of Fools (1987)
 The Snake Tattoo (1989)
 Coyote (1990)
 Steel Guitar (1991)
 Snapshot (1993)
 Hardware (1995)
 Cold Case (1997)
 Flashpoint (1999) 
 The Big Dig (2002)
 Deep Pockets (2004)
 Heart Of The World (2006)
 Lie Down With The Devil (2008)

Em Moore
The Perfect Ghost (2013)

Book reviews
The Perfect Ghost Carolyn Haley's book review in the New York Journal of Books noted “Don’t be surprised if Linda Barnes gets an award for The Perfect Ghost, . . .”
Kirkus wrote "Barnes puts aside her Carlotta Carlyle series (Lie Down With the Devil, 2008, etc.) for an eerie, suspenseful stand-alone that focuses more on the characters and their dark pasts than on a clever mystery."
Publishers Weekly wrote "Although the mystery is slow to build, Barnes delivers a captivating story of love, rivalry, and revenge."

Awards

Wins
 1986 Anthony award for Best short story, "Lucky Penny"
 1987 Edgar award for Best novel, A Trouble of Fools

Nominations
 1986 Shamus award for Best private eye short story, "Lucky Penny"
 1988 Anthony award for Best novel, A Trouble of Fools
 1988 Edgar award for Best mystery novel, A Trouble of Fools
 1988 Shamus award for Best private eye novel, A Trouble of Fools

References

External links
 

1949 births
American crime fiction writers
American women novelists
20th-century American novelists
Living people
Boston University College of Fine Arts alumni
Anthony Award winners
Writers from Detroit
20th-century American women writers
Women mystery writers
Novelists from Michigan
21st-century American novelists
21st-century American women writers